The Greater Gulf State Fair is an annual fair and agricultural show that is held at the Greater Gulf State Fairgrounds in Mobile, Alabama. It features livestock competitions, rides, concessions, motor contests, and concerts. It has been held every year since 1955, and moved to its current location in 1974. The event's name stems from its serving of people from Lower Alabama, Lower Mississippi, and the Panhandle of Florida. It is the largest fair in the state of Alabama.

Background
The Greater Gulf State Fair began as a fund-raising initiative for the Mobile Jaycees, a group of members of the Mobile Junior Chamber of Commerce. It was first held at Blakeley Island in 1955, and drew 60,000 people in its inaugural year. Elvis Presley was the first concert performer, and offered them a four-year contract to return, but the Fair declined. With the event gaining success, the Jaycees hired a president to oversee planning in 1958. During these years, the event took place at Ladd Stadium, and later at Hartwell Field in Mobile. In 1974, the Fair moved to its permanent residence at The Grounds in west Mobile. It was renamed "the Grounds" in 2014.

The rides present at each Fair are a combination of the Fair that begins in Canada, travels down opposite seaboards, and regroups in Mobile.

References 

Festivals in Mobile, Alabama
Agricultural shows in the United States
Annual fairs
Recurring events established in 1955
October events
November events
Fairs in the United States
1955 establishments in Alabama